Markvard Armin Sellevoll (14 November 1923 – 22 March 2020) was a Norwegian geophysicist.

He was born in Alversund. He worked as a docent in seismology at the University of Bergen from 1961 to 1975, and professor from 1975 to 1990. He was among the people who established NORSAR. He was a member of the Norwegian Academy of Science and Letters. He died in 2020.

References

1923 births
2020 deaths
People from Lindås
Norwegian geophysicists
Academic staff of the University of Bergen
Members of the Norwegian Academy of Science and Letters